Axholme Line–Haxey is a 7.23-hectare Local Nature Reserve near the village of Haxey in North Lincolnshire. It is owned and managed by North Lincolnshire Council. It is composed of neutral calcareous grassland encompassing a stretch of the disused Axholme Joint Railway which runs from Haxey to land adjacent to Low Burnham. The site can be accessed by the public opposite Haxey Primary School.

References

Local Nature Reserves in Lincolnshire
Borough of North Lincolnshire